Iorwerth Isaac (12 October 1911 – 25 April 1966) commonly known as Iorrie Isaac, was a Welsh dual-code international rugby union, and professional rugby league footballer who played in the 1930s.

Rugby career
Isaac was first selected for Wales in their opening game of the 1933 Home Nations Championship. The match was against England at their national stadium, Twickenham. Wales had failed to win at the ground in their first nine attempts, and the Welsh failure at the ground was known as the 'Twickenham bogey'. Isaac was placed at open-side flanker, opposite the veteran Tom Arthur who was positioned on the blind side. Isaac, along with Turnbull, and Arthur, continually spoiled the English scrum. When Isaac caused the English half-backs to loose the loose maul, Watcyn Thomas heeled the ball back for Wooller, and then Davey to feed Ronnie Boon who scored a Welsh try. The game ended 7–3, with all the Welsh points scored by Boon, who had also placed a drop goal. Isaacs played just one more international game in the very next match of the Home Nations Championship against Scotland at St. Helens, his international career identical to that of Raymond Bark-Jones.

At the start of the 1933/34 season Isaac left rugby union behind when he 'Went North' switching to the professional rugby league game, joining Leeds RLFC.

International matches played
Wales
  1933
  1933

International Rugby League honours
Isaac won caps for Wales (RL) while at Leeds in 1933 against Australia, and 1935 against France.

Bibliography

References

External links
(archived by web.archive.org) Pontypridd RFC player profile

1911 births
1966 deaths
Cardiff RFC players
Cilfynydd RFC players
Dual-code rugby internationals
Glamorgan Police RFC players
Glamorgan Police officers
Leeds Rhinos players
Penarth RFC players
Pontypridd RFC players
Rugby league players from Rhondda Cynon Taf
Rugby union flankers
Rugby union players from Cilfynydd
Wales international rugby union players
Wales national rugby league team players
Welsh police officers
Welsh rugby league players
Welsh rugby union players